Alan Bernard Lidiard (May 9, 1928 – November 21, 2020), or A. B. Lidiard, was a British condensed matter physicist known for his research into defects in materials.

Education and career 
Lidiard studied theoretical physics under Charles Coulson at King's College London, obtaining an MSc in 1950 and a PhD in 1952. He spent two years as a Fulbright scholar in the USA, first as a research assistant for Friedrich Seitz at the University of Illinois Urbana-Champaign and then under Charles Kittel at University of California, Berkeley. He took up a research fellowship in the Theoretical Division at Atomic Energy Research Establishment in Harwell. Between 1957 and 1961, he was a Lecturer in Theoretical Physics at University of Reading. He returned to Harwell and set up the radiation damage theory group in the Theoretical Physics Division (TPD). Lidiard became the head of the TPD in 1966 until his retirement. Afterwards, he moved to the Department of Physics at University of Reading and the Department of Theoretical Chemistry at Oxford University.

Honors and awards 
Lidiard was awarded the Guthrie Medal in 1988. He was a Fellow of the Institute of Physics and a Fellow of the Royal Society of Chemistry.

Personal life 
Lidiard married three times. He has two daughters from his second marriage.

Bibliography

See also 
 Marshall Stoneham
 Richard Catlow

References 

1928 births
2020 deaths
Alumni of King's College London
University of Reading
British physicists
Condensed matter physicists
Academics of the University of Oxford
People from Waltham St Lawrence